European Maritime Day (EMD), celebrated on 20 May each year, seeks to raise European citizens' awareness of the seas and their importance. Several events take place during that day, including an annual stakeholder conference co-organised by the European Commission. European Maritime Day was established jointly by the European Council, European Parliament and European Commission in 2008 as part of the EU maritime policy.

The European Maritime Day is celebrated each year on 20 May since 2008. This annual event was established jointly by the European Council, the European Parliament and European Commission as part of the EU's Integrated Maritime Policy launched in 2007. Its aim is to provide an occasion to highlight the crucial role that oceans and seas play in the everyday life not only of coastal communities, but of all EU citizens, and for Europe's sustainable growth and jobs at large, and to encourage better stewardship of coastal zones, seas and oceans by all citizens and actors concerned. During European Maritime Day, tribute is paid to "Maritime Europe" and all maritime sectors and activities are put in the spotlight to help European citizens realise the real outreach and variety of sea-related activities going on in Europe.

EMD conferences

See also

Maritime Day
European Atlas of the Seas
International Maritime Organization

References

External links
 European Maritime Day – Europa
 European Maritime Day 2013
 European Maritime Day 2012 in Gothenburg
 EU maritime policy

Maritime culture in Europe
European Union
Maritime safety in Europe
May observances